Church of St Andrew is a  Grade I listed church in Langford, Bedfordshire, England. It became a listed building on 31 October 1966.

The three bells, the oldest of which dates back to 1772, are housed in their original wooden frame. The wheels have been replaced by a lever mechanism enabling them to be chimed but not rung.

See also
Grade I listed buildings in Bedfordshire

References

Church of England church buildings in Bedfordshire
Grade I listed churches in Bedfordshire